Chimur is a Lok Sabha parliamentary constituency of Maharashtra since 1967. Before  that, the area were broadly represented as Bhandara Lok Sabha constituency as it is two-seat constituency during 1951 and 1957 elections. During 1962 elections Gondia Lok Sabha constituency comes in existence and abolished before 1967 to come as Chimur in 1967. After delimitation of 2008, it comes as Gadchiroli-Chimur Lok Sabha constituency for 2009 elections to 15th Lok Sabha

Members of Lok Sabha

See also
 Chimur
 Gadchiroli-Chimur Lok Sabha constituency (2009 elections to 15th Lok Sabha onwards )
 Bhandara Lok Sabha constituency (See 1952 - 1957 elections to 1st and 2nd Lok Sabha )
 Gondia Lok Sabha constituency ( 1962 election to 3rd Lok Sabha )
 List of Constituencies of the Lok Sabha

1967 establishments in Maharashtra
Former Lok Sabha constituencies of Maharashtra
Former constituencies of the Lok Sabha
2008 disestablishments in India
Constituencies disestablished in 2008